Minor Academy of Sciences of Ukraine (Ukrainian: Мала Академія Наук України, Mala Akademiya Nauk Ukrainy) is the governmental organization of extracurricular education units in research and experimental area. It is an integral, multilevel system of recognition and selection of gifted children. Minor Academy of Sciences is subordinate the National Academy of Sciences, the Ministry of Education and Science of Ukraine and arose from the local network of pioneer palaces.

Goals 
Created to meet following goals:
 to provide mental, intellectual, creative development of school youth,
 to create conditions for social and vocational orientation,
 to form nation’s intellectual potential

Tasks 
Main tasks of Minor Academy of Sciences are:
 realization of state policy concerning work with gifted school youth;
 recognition, development and social support for gifted, bright and talented children;
 involvement of intellectually and creatively gifted children into scientific, research, experimental and creative activities;
 serving the school youth needs in vocational orientation and creative self-realization according to their interests and abilities;
 extension and systematization of pupils’ knowledge in different areas of science, formation of abilities, skills and culture of scientific research;
 implementation of contemporary methods and methodic of studying into educational process of general and extracurricular educational institutions, oriented on pupils’ research activity;
 study, generalization and expansion of the best pedagogical experience of  working with gifted children and youth;
 organization of social support for talented educators, who bring up future scientific generation.

Structure 
Minor Academy of Sciences of Ukraine unites 27 regional territorial departments which coordinate activities of district and city local departments and pupils’ scientific societies.

General coordination of the local departments’ activity is run by the National Centre “Minor Academy of Sciences of Ukraine”

Supreme governing body of MAoS is Presidium, members of which are outstanding scientists of our country – country leaders in their research field.

Presidium 
President – Oleksiy Dovgyy
Vice-President – Viktor Baryakhtar
Vice-President - Viktor Andrushchenko
Head of Chemistry and Biology Department  – Valeriy Kukhar
Head of Philology and Art Studies Department – Mykola Zhulynskyy
Head of Computer Science and Programming Department – Volodymyr Red’ko
Head of Physics and Mathematics Department – Anatoliy Samoylenko
Member of Presidium – Valeriy Heyets′
Member of Presidium – Dmytro Melnychuk
Member of Presidium – Viktor Grinchenko

Educational directions 
On the basis of Minor Academy of Sciences around 7 thousand scientific groups and sections in different areas, with over 200 thousand senior pupils are involved annually into scientific and research activity.
Scientific areas:

Science and technology
 287 groups
 3136 students
 Including 1009 students from rural areas
Computer science and programming
 760 groups
 9065 students
 Including 1690 students from rural area
Physics and mathematics
 1312 groups
 16220 students
 Including 4691 students from rural area
History and Geography
 1636 groups
 17489 students
 Including 7136 students from rural area
Chemistry and Biology
 1360 groups
 17621 students
 Including 6826 students from rural area
Philology and Art Studies
 1633 groups
 19257 students
 Including 5824 students from rural area

Assistance to young scientists and their scientific research is provided by over 6,5 thousand pedagogues and scientists from educational establishments and institutions, among which:

56,60% General educational institution teachers
28% University teachers
15,40% Extracurricular institution teachers

Activity of Minor Academy of Sciences consists of 10 scientific departments which include 56 sections in almost all scientific areas, that promotes recognition of the most talented and gifted youth of our young state and develops scientific potential of the country.

Among students of Minor Academy of Ukraine, there are quite a few gifted children, whose achievements are honored by medals, gratuities, charters, diplomas of Ministry of Education and Science of Ukraine, scholarships from President of Ukraine and prestige international awards.

References 

National Academy of Sciences of Ukraine